Amanda Noret is an American actress, best known for her role as Madison Sinclair in Veronica Mars.

Filmography

External links
 

Year of birth missing (living people)
Living people
American film actresses
American television actresses
21st-century American women